Fionn Hand (born 1 July 1998) is an Irish cricketer. He made his Twenty20 debut for Leinster Lightning in the 2018 Inter-Provincial Trophy on 6 July 2018. He made his List A debut for Leinster Lightning in the 2019 Inter-Provincial Cup on 23 May 2019. In June 2019, he was named in the Ireland Wolves squad for their home series against the Scotland A cricket team. He made his first-class debut for Leinster Lightning in the 2019 Inter-Provincial Championship on 18 June 2019. In May 2022, Cricket Ireland awarded Hand a nine-month contract.

In July 2022, Hand was added to Ireland's Twenty20 International (T20I) squad for their home series against New Zealand. Later the same month, Hand was also named in Ireland's T20I squads for their matches against South Africa in Bristol, and for their home series against Afghanistan. He made his T20I debut on 12 August 2022, against Afghanistan.

In September 2022, he was named in Ireland's squad for the 2022 ICC Men's T20 World Cup tournament in the Australia, where he bowled Ben Stokes with what was widely believed to be the ball of the tournament.

References

External links
 

1998 births
Living people
Irish cricketers
Ireland Twenty20 International cricketers
Place of birth missing (living people)
Leinster Lightning cricketers
Munster Reds cricketers